Vegas (Spanish for "fertile valleys") is short for Las Vegas, a major tourist destination in the United States.

Vegas may also refer to:

Places
Vegas Creek, Nevada, an historical place located southeast of Las Vegas
Vegas, Cayey, Puerto Rico, a barrio
Vegas, Yauco, Puerto Rico, a barrio

People
 Dimitri Vegas (Dimitri Thivaios, born 1982), Belgian DJ
 Jhonattan Vegas, Venezuelan golfer
 Johnny Vegas, English actor and comedian
 Koke Vegas, Spanish football goalkeeper
 Lolly Vegas, musician
 Mr. Vegas, a Jamaican dancehall singer
 Pat Vegas, musician
 Tony Vegas, member of the turntablist DJ crew Scratch Perverts

Algorithms and technology
 Magix Vegas Pro, video and audio editing software
 Orange Vegas, a touchscreen mobile phone released by Orange in 2009
 TCP Vegas, a congestion avoidance algorithm
 VEGAS algorithm

Arts, entertainment, and media

Games
 Fallout: New Vegas, a 2010 video game
 Tom Clancy's Rainbow Six: Vegas, a 2006 video game
 Tom Clancy's Rainbow Six: Vegas 2, a 2007 video game

Music

Groups
 Vegas (band), a Greek band
 Vegas (duo), a musical collaboration of Terry Hall and David A. Stewart

Albums
 Vegas (The Crystal Method album)
 Vegas (Vegas album), Hall and Stewart's 1992 album

Songs
 "Vegas" (Doja Cat song), a 2022 song by Doja Cat from the 2022 film Elvis
 "Vegas" (Sleeper song), a 1995 song by Sleeper
 "Vegas", a 2014 song by Bad Meets Evil from Shady XV
 "Vegas", a 2007 song by Calvin Harris from I Created Disco
 "Vegas", a 2000 song by New Found Glory from New Found Glory
 "Vegas", a 2007 song by Sara Bareilles from Little Voice
 "Goin' to Vegas", a 1998 song by Jimmy Ray from Jimmy Ray

Television

 Vegas (1978 TV series), an American crime drama television series on ABC
 Vegas (2012 TV series), an American period drama television series on CBS
 Vegas (New Zealand TV series), a New Zealand drama television series on TVNZ
 "Vegas" (Malcolm in the Middle), a 2003 episode
 "Vegas" (Roseanne), a 1991 episode
 "Vegas" (Stargate Atlantis), a 2009 episode

Other arts, entertainment, and media

 Vegas (pinball machine)

Other uses
 Vegas Oil and Gas, a petroleum exploration company in Egypt

See also 
 De la Vega (disambiguation)
 La Vega (disambiguation)
 Las Vegas (disambiguation)
 Vega (disambiguation)
 Vagus nerve